Carla Fernanda Ochoa Peñailillo (born March 21, 1979 in Santiago) is a Chilean show woman  who participated in Miss Chile. In 2007, she won the contest Queen of the Pampilla Festival in Coquimbo. As a show woman, she has appeared in television shows like Morandé con Compañía and Mekano.  She also appeared in the extreme reality show Pelotón.

She is close friend of the ex-Miss Chile Isabel Bawlitza and of her fellow ex-contestant of Pelotón, Mariela Montero.  At 26 years old, Ochoa gave birth to a girl named Josefa. Recently in February 2010, Carla participated for the 2010 Viña del Mar International Song Festival's queen election, where she obtained the 2nd place, the winner was Carolina Arregui.

References

External links
Carla Ochoa's official website

1979 births
Chilean television personalities
Chilean people of Basque descent
Living people
People from Santiago
Chilean beauty pageant winners
Reality television participants